Friendship Circle is a charity for children and young people with special needs. The organization is run by the Chabad Hasidic movement. The organization pairs Jewish high school student volunteers with children with special needs.

Activities
Friendship Circle organizes walkathons to raise funds for children with special needs. Other initiatives include art auctions.

A New Jersey chapter of Friendship Circle opened a "LifeTown" center in Livingston, a  multi-faceted center where young people with special needs can learn life skills in a supportive environment. The center includes therapy and health facilities as well as an aquatics center. LifeTown Shoppes have stores and businesses where young people can learn life skills with the help of volunteers and professional staff. The center  provides services to 30,000 young people each year. The center is modeled after a Michigan center.

Some Friendship Circle chapters have turned to founding social enterprise programs employing young people with special needs, such as bakeries and thrift shops.

References

Children's charities based in the United States
Charities based in Michigan
Organizations based in Detroit
Chabad organizations